KWKA (680 AM) is a radio station licensed to serve Clovis, New Mexico.  The station is owned by Zia Broadcasting. It broadcasts a sports format.

The station was assigned the KWKA call letters by the Federal Communications Commission.

This radio station was founded by Norm Petty, producer for Buddy Holly and the Crickets and The Fireballs. The call letters KWKA were requested by Petty after a conversation with Beatle Paul McCartney, who said one of his favorite American radio stations was KWKH, in Louisiana. The station was sold to Zia Broadcasting in 2009.

References

External links
FCC History Cards for KWKA
KWKA 680 AM Facebook

WKA
Sports radio stations in the United States
Clovis, New Mexico